The Sands of Egypt is a 1982 graphic adventure game written by James Garon, Ralph Burris, and Steve Bjork of Datasoft for the TRS-80 Color Computer. It was licensed to Tandy Corporation and was the first disk-only game for the Color Computer sold by RadioShack. Ports to the Atari 8-bit family in 1982 and Apple II in 1983 were published by Datasoft. Set in 1893, the game follows a  British explorer and archaeologist who is lost in the desert. Text commands are entered in the lower half of the screen, while a sometimes animated image of the current location is displayed in the upper half.

Gameplay

The top half of the screen shows an image of the current location. The player interacts with the game by typing commands in the bottom half, as in an interactive fiction game. Commands are either in a "VERB NOUN" format or single words such as N for "move north". The number of moves made is tracked as the score and can be displayed via the SCORE command. The player needs to periodically drink water to stay alive.

Reception
Owen Linzmayer, reviewing the Color Computer original for Creative Computing, wrote "In comparison with other adventures, The Sands of Egypt does feel a bit shallow" and "the game relies strongly on perseverence and patience." In Electronic Games, Tracie Forman didn't mention the puzzles, but wrote "By far the most striking thing about The Sands of Egypt is its eye-pleasing animation" and called it "an exceptional gaming experience."

In a walkthrough of part of the game for TRS-80 Microcomputer News, Bruce Elliott discussed the HELP command:

See also
The Dallas Quest, similarly styled game from Datasoft

References

External links
 TRS-80 Color Computer game manual
 Review in Softline
 Review in Page 6
 Review in Page 6
 Casus Belli #22 (Oct 1984)

1982 video games
Adventure games
Apple II games
Atari 8-bit family games
Datasoft games
TRS-80 Color Computer games
Video games developed in the United States
Video games set in Egypt
Single-player video games